San Basilio is the 30th quartiere of Rome (Italy), identified by the initials Q. XXX. It belongs to the Municipio IV.

References

External links